Portugal was represented at the 2010 European Athletics Championships, held in Barcelona, Spain, from 27 July to 1 August 2010, with a delegation of 42 competitors (24 men and 18 women), who took part in 24 events.

Medalists

Participants

References 
Participants list

Nations at the 2010 European Athletics Championships
2010
European Athletics Championships